Matthew Taberner (born 17 June 1993) is an Australian rules footballer who plays for the Fremantle Football Club in the Australian Football League (AFL). He mainly plays as a key position forward.

Early life
Originally from Bright, Victoria, Taberner played for Myrtleford in the Ovens & Murray Football League and the Murray Bushrangers in the TAC Cup. He was drafted to Fremantle with the 11th selection at the 2013 Rookie Draft. Taberner missed the start of the 2013 season due to a bout of glandular fever.  He made his debut for Peel Thunder in the West Australian Football League (WAFL) in the 6th round of the 2013 WAFL season, and kicking 9 goals from his next 7 matches.

AFL career
Taberner made his AFL debut in Round 13, 2013 against North Melbourne at Patersons Stadium.  He struggled to hold his place in the side, playing only four games in 2013 and six in 2014, before an impressive performance against Brisbane Lions in Round 22 earned him a nomination for the 2014 AFL Rising Star.  Playing as Fremantle's only tall forward due to captain Matthew Pavlich's late withdrawal due to injury, Taberner collected 24 disposals, took 10 marks and kicked a goal as Fremantle thrashed Brisbane by 58 points.

Taberner was out of contract at the end of the 2017 season, and due to poor form wasn't selected by Fremantle early in the season. In the second half of the season he lifted his output for WAFL side Peel Thunder, forcing his way into the senior side for the final three matches. He played only eight games for Fremantle and kicked 11 goals in the 2017 season. At the end of 2017, after putting contract talks on hold, he eventually signed a two-year contract extension, keeping him at the club until the end of 2019. One of his standout performances came against Essendon at Domain Stadium in round 7. He finished the game with 4 goals, 9 marks and 18 disposals. The dockers beat Essendon in that game by 37 points. Starting off the 2018 season in strong form, he fractured a metatarsal bone in his left foot in the Round 5 clash with the Western Bulldogs. He later returned, after 15 weeks recovering from his injury, in time for the Round 20 Western Derby against West Coast. He finished the season having played 9 games, and kicking 10 goals.

Taberner started 2019 in brilliant fashion, with his strong marking ability displayed regularly. His standout game came against GWS in Round 5, where he kicked 3.3, amassed 21 disposals, took 13 marks, and was arguably Fremantle's best player on the day. Unfortunately, his 2019 season came to an abrupt end as a result of a stress fracture in his left foot, after the Round 9 clash with Essendon. He finished the season having kicked 13.10, and amassing 24 contested marks (avg. of 2.7 per game) from his 9 games.

2020 was a breakout season for Taberner, who finished the season as Fremantle's leading goalkicker with 29 goals (from 16 games), which also placed him in equal 4th for the Coleman medal. Taberner was second in the AFL for contested marks, finishing the season with 38 (an average of 2.4 per game). He was named in the initial 40 man squad for the All-Australian team but was overlooked in the final team announcement. Round five of the 2022 AFL season saw Taberner receive much praise for his performance against  at Marvel Stadium kicking a career-best seven goal haul.

Statistics
 Statistics are correct to the end of round 10, 2022

|- style="background-color: #EAEAEA"
! scope="row" style="text-align:center" | 2013
|style="text-align:center;"|
| 42 || 4 || 2 || 0 || 18 || 11 || 29 || 11 || 9 || 0.5 || 0.0 || 4.5 || 2.8 || 7.2 || 2.8 || 2.2 || 0
|-
! scope="row" style="text-align:center" | 2014
|style="text-align:center;"|
| 20 || 9 || 7 || 6 || 61 || 31 || 92 || 40 || 25 || 0.8 || 0.7 || 6.8 || 3.4 || 10.2 || 4.4 || 2.8 || 0
|- style="background-color: #EAEAEA"
! scope="row" style="text-align:center" | 2015
|style="text-align:center;"|
| 20 || 15 || 14 || 7 || 83 || 42 || 125 || 51 || 20 || 0.9 || 0.5 || 5.5 || 2.8 || 8.3 || 3.4 || 1.3 || 0
|-
! scope="row" style="text-align:center" | 2016
|style="text-align:center;"|
| 20 || 17 || 18 || 6 || 121 || 89 || 210 || 82 || 41 || 1.1 || 0.4 || 7.1 || 5.2 || 12.4 || 4.8 || 2.4 || 0
|- style="background-color: #EAEAEA"
! scope="row" style="text-align:center" | 2017
|style="text-align:center;"|
| 20 || 8 || 11 || 6 || 65 || 27 || 92 || 43 || 20 || 1.4 || 0.8 || 8.1 || 3.4 || 11.5 || 5.4 || 2.5 || 0
|-
! scope="row" style="text-align:center" | 2018
|style="text-align:center;"|
| 20 || 9 || 10 || 7 || 88 || 47 || 135 || 48 || 12 || 1.1 || 0.8 || 9.8 || 5.2 || 15.0 || 5.3 || 1.3 || 0
|- style="background-color: #EAEAEA"
! scope="row" style="text-align:center" | 2019
|style="text-align:center;"|
| 20 || 9 || 13 || 10 || 105 || 44 || 149 || 72 || 18 || 1.4 || 1.1 || 11.7 || 4.9 || 16.6 || 8.0 || 2.0 || 2
|-
! scope="row" style="text-align:center" | 2020
|style="text-align:center;"|
| 20 || 16 || 29 || 13 || 129 || 37 || 166 || 92 || 8 || 1.8 || 0.8 || 8.1 || 2.3 || 10.4 || 5.8 || 0.5 || 3
|- style="background-color: #EAEAEA"
! scope="row" style="text-align:center" | 2021
|style="text-align:center;"|
| 20 || 16 || 37 || 17 || 135 || 42 || 117 || 89 || 10 || 2.3 || 1.1 || 8.4 || 2.6 || 11.1 || 5.6 || 0.6 || 2
|-
! scope="row" style="text-align:center" | 2022
|style="text-align:center;"|
| 20 || 5 || 12 || 2 || 41 || 8 || 49 || 22 || 3 || 2.4 || 0.4 || 8.2 || 1.6 || 9.8 || 4.4 || 0.6 || TBA
|- class="sortbottom"
! colspan=3| Career
! 108
! 153
! 74
! 846
! 378
! 1224
! 550
! 166
! 1.4
! 0.7
! 7.8
! 3.5
! 11.3
! 5.1
! 1.5
! 7
|}

References

External links

Matt Taberner's WAFL playing statistics

1993 births
Living people
People from Bright, Victoria
Fremantle Football Club players
Peel Thunder Football Club players
Australian rules footballers from Victoria (Australia)
Murray Bushrangers players
Myrtleford Football Club players